Rogeria longiflora, also known as the white djirrie, is a species of flowering plant in the genus Rogeria. It is endemic to Namibia.

Distribution 
Rogeria longiflora is found from Namibia to the Northern Cape.

Conservation status 
Rogeria longiflora is classified as Least Concern.

References

External links 
 
 

Endemic flora of Namibia
Flora of South Africa
Flora of Southern Africa
Flora of the Cape Provinces
Pedaliaceae